Antonio Moreno (1887–1967) was a Spanish-American actor.

Antonio Moreno may also refer to:
Antonio Moreno Casamitjana (1927–2013), Chilean archbishop
Antônio Carlos Moreno (born 1948), Brazilian volleyball player
Antonio Moreno (born 1983), Spanish football fullback
Antonio Moreno (born 1983), Spanish football forward

See also
Antonia Moreno Leyva (1848–1916), Peruvian first lady
Luis Antonio Moreno (born 1970), Colombian footballer
Toñi Moreno (born 1973), Spanish television journalist